Coiffaitarctia ockendeni is a moth of the family Erebidae first described by Walter Rothschild in 1909. It is found in French Guiana, Suriname, the Amazon region, Peru and Bolivia.

References

Phaegopterina
Moths of South America
Fauna of the Amazon
Moths described in 1909